Hector Schuster (15 January 1942 – 26 November 2007) was a New Zealand cricketer. He played first-class cricket for Auckland and Northern Districts between 1963 and 1972.

See also
 List of Auckland representative cricketers

References

External links
 

1942 births
2007 deaths
New Zealand cricketers
Auckland cricketers
Northern Districts cricketers